Monique Taylor  (born 28 June 1972) is a Canadian politician in Ontario, Canada. She is a New Democratic member of the Legislative Assembly of Ontario who represents the riding of Hamilton Mountain. She has been an MPP since 2011.

Background 
Taylor was born in east end of Hamilton and grew up in the city. She has worked as a waitress and most recently as administrative assistant to Hamilton City Councillor Scott Duvall.

Politics 
In 2011, she ran as the New Democrat candidate in the riding of Hamilton Mountain. She beat Liberal incumbent Sophia Aggelonitis by 5,798 votes. She was re-elected in the 2014 provincial election defeating Liberal candidate Javid Mirza by 8,483 votes.

In 2012, she introduced a private member's bill that would have extended Ontario ombudsman's oversight to Children Aid Societies. The bill made it to second reading but the bill died when Premier Dalton McGuinty prorogued the house in September 2012.

She is the NDP's critic for children and youth services, and critic for accessibility and persons with disabilities.

In May 2016, Taylor was ejected from the legislature for repeatedly refusing the Speaker's requests to stop yelling while debating a new Ontario Autism Program with $333 million in funding, but which would move kids with autism older than five to a longer but less intensive therapy program and compensate their families with $8000 for being taken off the intensive therapy waitlist.

In spring 2018, news reports surfaced that two human rights complaints were filed against Taylor by staffers in March 2018. One human rights complaint alleges Taylor attempted to force and coerce one of her assistants to accuse another coworker of sexual harassment to erroneously produce grounds for the employee's termination. The other complaint details MPP Taylor bullying and discriminating against her staff. The complaints were subsequently resolved in December of the same year.

In February 2019, Taylor was ejected from the legislature after refusing to withdraw a remark where she accused the Progressive Conservative government led by Premier Doug Ford of lying to Ontario families about the autism waitlist.

In April 2022, she co-sponsored a bill put forward by MPP Bill Walker that would declare each June in Ontario myasthenia gravis month.

Electoral record

References

External links 
 
 

1972 births
Living people
Ontario New Democratic Party MPPs
Politicians from Hamilton, Ontario
Women MPPs in Ontario
21st-century Canadian politicians
21st-century Canadian women politicians